Luiz Antonio Linhares Garcia (born 11 November 1985), commonly known as Ferron, is a Brazilian footballer who plays for Ponte Preta as a central defender.

Club career
Born in Rondonópolis, Mato Grosso, Ferron made his senior debuts with Tubarão, after representing União Bandeirante and Atlético Mineiro as a youth. In 2008, he moved abroad for the first time in his career, joining Hong Kong Premier League side Sun Pegasus FC.

Ferron returned to his homeland in the following year, after agreeing a deal with São José EC. After a short period with Mirassol he returned to São José in August 2009, remaining at the club until May of the following year.

In 2010 Ferron signed for Ituiutaba, appearing with the side in Série C. On 19 December 2010 he moved to Série B side Ponte Preta.

Ferron made his professional debut on 21 May 2011, starting in a 5–0 home routing over ASA, and scored his first goal six days later, but in a 1–3 away loss against Vila Nova. He finished the campaign with 30 appearances and three goals, as his side returned to Série A.

On 20 May 2012 Ferron made his debut in the main category of Brazilian football, playing the full 90 minutes in a 0–1 home loss against Atlético Mineiro. He scored his first goal in the top level on 22 July, netting his side's only in a 1–2 loss against Fluminense also at the Estádio Moisés Lucarelli.

On 12 December 2012 Ferron renewed with Ponte for a further year, but opted to leave the club roughly a year later, joining Sport Recife. On 22 December 2014, after appearing sparingly for the latter, he joined Figueirense.

References

External links

1985 births
Living people
People from Rondonópolis
Brazilian footballers
Association football defenders
Campeonato Brasileiro Série A players
Campeonato Brasileiro Série B players
Uberlândia Esporte Clube players
Clube 15 de Novembro players
São José Esporte Clube players
Mirassol Futebol Clube players
Boa Esporte Clube players
Associação Atlética Ponte Preta players
Criciúma Esporte Clube players
Sport Club do Recife players
Figueirense FC players
TSW Pegasus FC players
Brazilian expatriate footballers
Brazilian expatriate sportspeople in Hong Kong
Expatriate footballers in Hong Kong
União Esporte Clube players
Sportspeople from Mato Grosso